Gemma Geis i Carreras (born 9 November 1979) is a Spanish academic and politician from Catalonia, member of the regional Parliament of Catalonia and the current Minister of Research and Universities of Catalonia.

Early life
Geis was born on 9 November 1979 in Girona, Catalonia. Her great-grandfather was a Republican Left of Catalonia mayor of Sarrià de Ter in the 1930s and was later imprisoned by the fascist Franco dictatorship. Her great-uncle was author and composer Camil Geis. Geis and her sister Cristina grew up in the Pont Major neighbourhood of Girona where their parents Martí and Quimeta had a metal workshop. As a child she helped out in the family business.

Geis was educated at Institut Carles Rahola where she was a contemporary of Roger Torrent. She has a degree in law (1998-02) from the University of Girona (UdG) and a master's degree in legal practice from the Barcelona Bar Association (Il·lustre Col·legi d'Advocats de Barcelona). In 2011 the UdG awarded her an extraordinary prize for her 2008 law doctorate thesis "La Ejecución de las Sentencias Urbanísticas" (The Execution of Urban Judgments). For her doctorate she carried out research at the University of Florence, Paris 1 Panthéon-Sorbonne University and Harvard University.

Career
Geis practiced law at the Bar Association of Girona (Il·lustre Col·legi d'Advocats de Girona) but is currently registered as a non-practicing lawyer. She was a member of the Prague Group of Jurists. She has been teaching at the UdG since 2003 and is currently associate professor of administrative law. She was vice-rector of Regulatory Development, Governance and Communication at the UdG from 2013 to 2017.

Geis was a member of the Girona monitoring committee for the 2014 Catalan self-determination referendum (9-N). She was invited by Carles Puigdemont to contest the municipal elections in Girona but declined. However, following the 2017 Catalan independence referendum (1-O), she decided to temporarily suspend her academic career and enter politics. She contested the 2017 regional election as an independent Together for Catalonia (JuntsxCat) electoral alliance candidate in the Province of Girona and was elected to the Parliament of Catalonia. She was re-elected at the 2021 regional election.

Considered a Puigdemont ally, she was heavily involved in JuntsxCat and the National Call for the Republic. On 26 May 2021 she was sworn in as Minister of Research and Universities in the new government of President Pere Aragonès.

Other activities
 Barcelona Institute for Global Health (ISGlobal), Member of the Board of Trustees
 Greenpeace, Member

Personal life
Geis has two children.

Electoral history

References

External links

1979 births
Academics from Catalonia
Aragonès Government
Independent politicians in Catalonia
Lawyers from Catalonia
Living people
Government ministers of Catalonia
Members of the 12th Parliament of Catalonia
Members of the 13th Parliament of Catalonia
National Call for the Republic politicians
People from Girona
Together for Catalonia (2017) politicians
Together for Catalonia (2020) politicians
University of Girona alumni
Academic staff of the University of Girona
Women members of the Parliament of Catalonia